(The Sorcerer's Daughter) is a children's opera in two acts by Lorenzo Ferrero set to an Italian-language libretto by Marco Ravasini. The libretto, inspired by Mario Lavagetto's book Quei più modesti romanzi: il libretto nel melodramma di Verdi, is written in an imaginary language which emphasises the element of play. The music is a sequence of closed numbers "which spoof the most common operatic conventions." The aim of the opera is to show children how Italian opera functions. Alongside professional singers, children take mime roles.

Performance history
The premiere directed by Caterina Mattea and conducted by Jan Latham Koenig took place in Montepulciano, at the Cantiere Internazionale d'Arte on 31 July 1981. The opera had many subsequent new productions: in Florence, at the Teatro Comunale Florence on 23 November 1991, Milan, at La Scala on 11 March 1992, and Naples at Teatro di San Carlo on 7 March 1995; in Rouen, at Opéra de Rouen on 8 November 1992, and Mâcon, at the Scène Nationale on 27 March 1993; in Palm Beach, at Palm Beach Opera on 17 October 1993; in Helsinki, at the Finnish National Theatre on 4 May 1994; in Brighton, at the Brighton Festival on 22 May 1997; in Milan, as a school project of Caravaggio and Carducci High Schools, on 22 May 2000; in Kiel, at the Fischmarkthalle Kiel-Wellingdorf on 30 May 2008.

Roles

Synopsis

Act 1

On a dark, stormy night a ship makes a desperate attempt to land. Prince Tenor returns from an exotic place with his fiancée, Princess Soprano, and with handsome travel gifts, including two exotic animals. Tenor’s father, King Baritone, utterly rejects the princess because she is both a foreigner and the offspring of a sorcerer. Soprano’s father, King Bass, arrives accompanied by his pet sea monster and tries to persuade his daughter to come back home. As she refuses, he uses his magic powers to make the animals attack Baritone's court. During the ensuing battle, Tenor runs to the defence of his father and manages to save him. In spite of this demonstration of his worth he is still denied permission to marry Soprano.

Act 2

In his bedroom, King Baritone is having a restless night. King Bass' sea monster enters and is about to attack him when, once again, Tenor rushes in and puts the monster to flight. Waking up, King Baritone catches Tenor with the sword in his hand and accuses him of attempted patricide. He condemns Tenor and Soprano to death and throws them into prison. Just as they are about to be executed King Bass bursts in to liberate his daughter, but she seizes his magic wand and casts a spell which forces the two fathers to perform a frantic dance until they beg for mercy and give their consent for the marriage. There is general rejoicing as preparations are made for the wedding ceremony. Everyone, including the two fantastic animals and the sea monster, joins in.

References
Notes

Sources
Bagnoli, Giorgio (1993). The La Scala Encyclopedia of the Opera. New York: Simon & Schuster. 
Fearn, Raymond (1998). Italian Opera since 1945. London: Routledge. 
Girardi, Enrico (2000). Il teatro musicale italiano oggi: La generazione della post-avanguardia. Torino: De Sono-Paravia. 
Holden, Amanda, ed. (2001). The New Penguin Opera Guide. London: Penguin Books. 
Lanza, Andrea (1980). Il secondo novecento. Turin: EDT Srl. 
Moliterno, Gino, ed. (2000). Encyclopaedia of Contemporary Italian Culture. London and New York: Routledge. 
Pugliaro, Giorgio, ed. (1992). Opera '92: Annuario dell'opera lirica in Italia. Turin: EDT Srl. 
Sadie, Stanley, ed. (1992–2002). The New Grove Dictionary of Opera. London: Macmillan Publishers.

External links
Catalogue entry at Casa Ricordi
Title page of sheet music at Casa Ricordi Digital Collection

Operas
Operas by Lorenzo Ferrero
1981 operas
Italian-language operas
Children's operas